Cambois Rowing Club is a rowing club on the River Wansbeck, based at Blackclose Bank, Riverside Park, Ashington, Northumberland and is affiliated to British Rowing.

Club colours
The blade colours are green with a white fly (also called outboard) triangle; kit: green.

History
The club was founded in 1911 on the River Blyth and it was not until 1977 that it moved to the current location.

The club has produced multiple British champions.

Honours

British champions

References

Sport in Northumberland
Rowing clubs in England
Ashington